The Alsacienne or  is a breed of domestic chicken from Alsace, in eastern France. It was selectively bred in the 1890s, at a time when Alsace was part of the German Empire. Unlike most other French breeds, it has not been cross-bred with imported Oriental stock.

History

The Alsacienne is an ancient breed, perhaps as long-established as the Bresse Gauloise, which it closely resembles. The present type was formed in the late nineteenth century by selective breeding for a dual-purpose bird; Alsace was at this time a part of the German Empire. The Alsacienne may be related to the German Rheinländer breed, but is differentiated from it by the shape of the comb. In the twentieth century the breed came close to disappearance, and is still regarded as being at risk. A bantam was created in Alsace by Herscher, Hirschner and Trog; it was on the "endangered" list of the FAO in 2007.

Characteristics

Four colours are recognised for the Alsacienne: black, blue-laced, golden salmon and white. The ear-lobes are white.

Use

The Alsacienne is a good layer of large white eggs, which weigh at least .

In a tasting of the meat of 30 traditional French chicken breeds by a jury of well-known chefs including Pierre Troisgros, the Alsacienne was placed second, after the poulet de Bresse.

See also
 List of chicken breeds

References

Chicken breeds
Chicken breeds originating in France
Agriculture in Grand Est